The French term Escorteur (Escort Ship) appeared during the Second World War to designate a warship, of a medium or light displacement, whose mission was to protect ocean convoys and naval squadrons from attacks by submarines. The Imperial Japanese Navy used the denomination of Kaibokan for this type of naval ship.

The escorteurs of the French Navy 

 

In the immediate aftermath of the war, to fulfill the task of naval escorts, the French Navy was limited to a fleet of torpilleur and contre-torpilleur (otherwise known as destroyers), along with a number of avisos. They were later joined by several naval ships of German and Italian origin awarded as war reparations, and several escort bâtiments originated from the United Kingdom and the United States, all under different designations:
 Destroyer escort of 1,500 tons, constructed in the United States;
 Frigate of 1,200 tons, constructed in the United Kingdom;
 Corvettes of 600 tons, constructed in the United Kingdom;
 Coastal patrol boats of 400 tons,  constructed in the United States.

Construction of a new fleet 

During the years 1950–1960, France reconstituted the navy with the assistance of the United States which contributed most of the rebuilding program. Following certain hesitations, the term « escorteur » was finally chosen for this new type of warship, instead of the traditional « torpilleur » or « contre-torpilleur », which were abandoned.

The four families of escorteurs 

18 Squadron Escorteurs: 12  , 5 , 1  T 56 class: bâtiments of 3,000 tons, length , vocation anti-ship, anti-submarine, anti-aerial, picket radar flotilla navigation. They formed until the end of 1980s, the backbone forces of high-seas of the French Navy. For NATO, those were destroyers. 
 18 Rapid Escorteurs : Type E50 and Type E52; lighter bâtiments of 1,500 t, length , vocation anti-submarine, types E50, E52A, E52B. For NATO, those were frigates.
 9 Aviso Escorteurs : ; bâtiments of 2,100 t, length  , vocation anti-submarine and anti-ship. For NATO, those were frigates.
 14 Coastal Escorteurs : ( 3 Le Fougeux class and 11 L'Adroit class; bâtiments of 400 t,  length. For NATO, those were patrol boats and submarine chasers. 

The designation of « escorteur » is no longer used in the French Navy. The designation has been replaced by that of frigate, aviso or patrol boat.

See also 

 Fusiliers Marins
 List of active French Navy ships
 List of submarines of France
 List of ships of the line of France
 List of Escorteurs of the French Navy

References

Sources 
Jean Moulin, Rober Dumas, Les Escorteurs d'escadre, Marines éditions Nantes, 1997 

French Navy
Naval ships of France